This article presents a list of the historical events and publications of Australian literature during 1904.

Books 

 Louis Becke – Tom Gerrard
 Guy Boothby 
 A Bid for Freedom
 A Bride from the Sea
 A Consummate Scoundrel
 A Desperate Conspiracy
 An Ocean Secret
 Ada Cambridge – Sisters: A Novel
 G. B. Lancaster – Sons O' Men
 Louise Mack – Children of the Sun
 Rosa Praed – Nyria
 Ethel Turner – Mother's Little Girl

Short stories 

 Louis Becke – Under Tropic Skies
 Mabel Forrest – The Rose of Forgiveness and Other Stories
Laura Palmer-Archer – A Bush Honeymoon and other stories
 Banjo Paterson – "The Oracle at the Races"
 Steele Rudd – Sandy's Selection
 Ethel Turner – "The Carrying of the Baby"

Poetry 

 Victor J. Daley 
 "Anacreon"
 "Moderation"
 "Over the Wine"
 "The Parson and the Prelate"
 George Essex Evans – "A Drought Idyll"
 John Farrell – My Sundowner and Other Poems
 Henry Lawson 
 "The Ballad of the Elder Son"
 "The Last Review"
 "New Life, New Love"
 Louisa Lawson
 "Back Again"
 "Coming Home"
 Will Lawson – "Shelling Peas"
 Furnley Maurice – Some More Verses

Births 

A list, ordered by date of birth (and, if the date is either unspecified or repeated, ordered alphabetically by surname) of births in 1904 of Australian literary figures, authors of written works or literature-related individuals follows, including year of death.

 29 January – John Morrison, short story writer (died 1998)
 11 March – Hope Spencer, poet (died 1969)
 13 June – John K. Ewers, poet and novelist (died 1978)
1 September – Eve Langley, Australian-New Zealand novelist and poet (died 1974)

Deaths 

A list, ordered by date of death (and, if the date is either unspecified or repeated, ordered alphabetically by surname) of deaths in 1904 of Australian literary figures, authors of written works or literature-related individuals follows, including year of birth.

 8 January – John Farrell, poet (born 1851)
 9 February – Jennings Carmichael, poet and writer (born 1868)

See also 
 1904 in poetry
 List of years in literature
 List of years in Australian literature
 1904 in literature
 1903 in Australian literature
 1904 in Australia
 1905 in Australian literature

References

Literature
Australian literature by year
20th-century Australian literature